Kiel Maritime Museum (German - Schifffahrtsmuseum Kiel) is a museum in the German city of Kiel. It was established in 1978 in what had been the fish-auction hall in the Sartorikai area of the city. It shows the maritime history of Kiel.

In front of the museum is the lantern of the Alexander von Humboldt lightship, and docked nearby are the rescue boat Hindenburg, the fireboat Kiel, the passenger ship Stadt Kiel, and the buoy tender Bussard, all now museum ships.

External links
Kieler Schifffahrtsmuseum Fischhalle
museen am meer in der Landeshauptstadt Kiel

Maritime
Maritime museums in Germany